Kemp House may refer to:

in New Zealand
Mission House, at Kerikeri, New Zealand's oldest building, also known as Kemp House

in the United States
Newton-Kemp Houses, Bowling Green, Kentucky, listed on the National Register of Historic Places (NRHP)
Wascom House, in Hammond, Louisiana, NRHP-listed, also known as Kemp House 
Kemp Place, Reading, Massachusetts, NRHP-listed house, with Kemp Barn, also NRHP-listed
John Wolf Kemp House, Colonie, New York, NRHP-listed
Lewis Kemp House, Dayton, Ohio, NRHP-listed
E. A. Kemp House, Bryan, Texas, NRHP-listed
Kemp-Shepard House, Georgia, Vermont, NRHP-listed
John and Margarethe Kemp Cabin, Mazomanie, Wisconsin, NRHP-listed

See also
Kemp & Hebert Building, Spokane, Washington, NRHP-listed